The National Era was an abolitionist newspaper published weekly in Washington, D.C., from 1847 to 1860. Gamaliel Bailey was its editor in its first year. The National Era Prospectus stated in 1847:

Each number contained four pages of seven (later eight) columns each. The  National Era was noted for its large size and unique type. It featured the works of John Greenleaf Whittier, who served as associate editor, and the first publication, as a serial, of Harriet Beecher Stowe's Uncle Tom's Cabin (1851). It was also the setting for the first publication of Nathaniel Hawthorne's The Great Stone Face. In 1859, after Mr. Bailey's decease, his wife, Margaret Lucy Shands Bailey, served as publisher until the time of its suspension, February, 1860.

"The Soft Answer"
Two months after the establishment of The National Era, "The Soft Answer" was published on its back page by Timothy Shay Arthur. The short story was based on a business disagreement between two former friends, Mr. Singleton and Mr. Williams, set to be mediated by a Lawyer named Mr. Trueman. After receiving an unacceptable settlement offer from Williams, Singleton prepares an angry reply, only to be dissuaded from sending it by his lawyer. Singleton instead assents to signing a far more tactful and conciliatory reply composed by Trueman.

That tactful and conciliatory reply, which reconciled two former friends, is what is now known as "The Soft Answer". That idea suggested a gradualist approach to abolish slavery.

This idea of gradual steps to get two sides to agree is something that many felt that the North and South could use to abolish slavery and integrate the African Americans into society.

See also
Abolitionist publications

References

External links
  National Era archive (1847–60) via Fultonhistory.com

Abolitionist newspapers published in the United States
Newspapers established in 1847
Publications disestablished in 1860
1847 establishments in Washington, D.C.
Uncle Tom's Cabin
Defunct newspapers published in Washington, D.C.